Mădălin Marius Popa (born 5 July 1982) is a Romanian professional footballer and manager who currently plays and managed for Liga IV – Bihor County side Unirea Livada.

References

External links
 
 Mădălin Marius Popa at magyarfutball.hu
 Mădălin Marius Popa at frf-ajf.ro

1982 births
Living people
Sportspeople from Oradea
Romanian footballers
Association football defenders
Liga I players
FC Dinamo București players
ACF Gloria Bistrița players
CS Pandurii Târgu Jiu players
CS Minerul Motru players
Liga II players
AFC Dacia Unirea Brăila players
FC Bihor Oradea players
CS Luceafărul Oradea players
Nyíregyháza Spartacus FC players
Romanian expatriate footballers
Romanian expatriate sportspeople in Hungary
Expatriate footballers in Hungary